Scaevola glutinosa is a species of flowering plant in the family Goodeniaceae. It is a small, spreading shrub with fan-shaped blue flowers, toothed, oval-shaped leaves and grows in Queensland.

Description

Taxonomy and naming
Scaevola glutinosa was first formally described in 1990 by Roger Charles Carolin and the description was published in Telopea. The specific epithet (glutinosa) means "sticky".

Distribution and habitat
This scaevola grows mostly on limestone in Mt Isa at higher altitudes and the Great Dividing Range.

References

glutinosa
Flora of Queensland